Wilton is a hamlet in the Copeland district, in the county of Cumbria, England. It is near the small town of Egremont. In 1870-72 it had a population of 253. It was one of the sites involved in a 2010 shooting spree spanning Cumbria, when 52-year-old Derrick Bird shot several residents of Wilton, killing a couple.

References 

 Profile at uk-villages.co.uk

Hamlets in Cumbria
Borough of Copeland